Kim Jae-hwan may refer to:

Kim Jae-hwan (baseball) (born 1988), South Korean catcher and designated hitter
Kim Jae-hwan (handballer) (born 1966), South Korean handball player
Kim Jae-hoan (born 1988), South Korean footballer
Kim Jae-hwan (badminton) (born 1996), South Korean badminton player
Kim Jae-hwan (singer) (born 1996), South Korean singer